Doi Ngam is a tambon (subdistrict) of Phan District, in Chiang Rai Province, Thailand. In 2014 it had a population of 6,263 people.

Administration

Central administration
The tambon is subdivided into 14 administrative villages (muban).

Local administration
The area of the subdistrict is covered by the subdistrict administrative organization (SAO) Doi Ngam (องค์การบริหารส่วนตำบลดอยงาม)

References

External links
Thaitambon.com on Doi Ngam (Thai)
Doi Ngam subdistrict administrative organization (Thai)

Tambon of Chiang Rai province
Populated places in Chiang Rai province